Given (Japanese: ギヴン Hepburn: Givun; stylized in all lowercase) is a Japanese manga series written and illustrated by Natsuki Kizu. It has been serialized in the bimonthly manga magazine Chéri+ since 2013, and has been collected into eight tankōbon volumes by Shinshokan. The series follows a group of four students in an amateur rock band, and the dual romantic relationships that form among them: between electric guitarist Ritsuka Uenoyama and vocalist Mafuyu Satō, and between bassist Haruki Nakayama and drummer Akihiko Kaji.

The series has been adapted multiple times, notably as an audio drama in 2016, an 11-episode anime television series in 2019, an anime film in 2020, and a live-action television drama in 2021. The anime television series aired on Fuji TV's Noitamina programming block, and was the first boys' love (BL) series to air on Noitamina. An English-language translation of the manga is licensed in North America by the Viz Media-Animate joint publishing initiative SuBLime, while the anime and film are syndicated outside of Asia by the streaming service Crunchyroll.

Plot
Given is roughly divided into three major story arcs. The first arc, which focuses primarily on the relationship between Ritsuka and Mafuyu, follows the formation of the band and the lead-up to their first live performance. The second arc, which focuses primarily on the relationship between Akihiko and Haruki, follows the band as they prepare for their first music festival. After these two arcs, the manga is now going on with a third arc, based on Hiiragi and Shizusumi's relationship.

Ritsuka and Mafuyu
High schooler Ritsuka Uenoyama is the guitarist for a band composed of himself, bassist Haruki Nakayama, and drummer Akihiko Kaji. He becomes a reluctant guitar teacher to Mafuyu Satō, a shy classmate, after repairing the broken strings on Mafuyu's Gibson ES-330. Ritsuka quickly realizes that Mafuyu is an exceptionally talented singer, and invites him to join the band.

Ritsuka learns that Mafuyu's guitar was previously owned by Yūki Yoshida, Mafuyu's childhood best friend and boyfriend who died from suicide. The band begins composing music in advance of a live performance, but Mafuyu is unable to write lyrics for the song. On the day of the performance, Mafuyu has a breakthrough and sings a powerful song about his feelings of loss over Yūki. The song prompts Ritsuka and Mafuyu to act on their growing romantic feelings for each other; they kiss backstage and begin dating. The band names itself "Given", in tribute to the guitar given to Mafuyu by Yūki's mother after his passing.

Akihiko and Haruki
Given begins to develop a following after posting a video of their live performance online. The band decides to enter into a major amateur music festival, and begin preparing new material. Their efforts are complicated by Haruki's secret romantic feelings for Akihiko, and Akihiko's continued involvement with his ex-boyfriend Ugetsu Murata. Tensions mount until Akihiko is kicked out of the apartment he shares with Ugetsu; after Akihiko reveals to Haruki that he is aware of his feelings for him, they have an awkward and tense sexual encounter.

Lacking a place to live, Akihiko moves in with Haruki; their cohabitation grows to become pleasant, but rife with lingering romantic and interpersonal tension. The day of their qualifying concert, Akihiko ends his relationship with Ugetsu. Mafuyu leads the band in performing a new song he has written, but Given is not selected for the festival. Time passes, and Akihiko moves out of Haruki's apartment and commits seriously to music study. In the spring, following a violin competition, Akihiko confesses to Haruki that the changes he made in his life were to become a man worthy of Haruki's love. Akihiko asks Haruki to be his boyfriend, which Haruki accepts.

Characters

Main characters
 

 A 16-year-old high school student, and the band's lead vocalist and guitarist. Though he lacks experience and professional training, Mafuyu is a naturally gifted musician and singer, and quickly becomes a skilled guitar player, singer, and songwriter. He suppresses his emotions following the suicide of his boyfriend Yūki, resulting in an outwardly shy and aloof personality, but he becomes ferociously expressive when he performs. He owns a nine-month-old Pomeranian named Kedama.
 
 
 A 16-year-old high school student, and the band's lead guitarist. Having played guitar since he was a child, he is highly practiced and talented with the instrument. He has a kind personality, though is somewhat stoic and bullish in his interactions with others, and is inexperienced in matters of love and romance. As the series commences he has lost his enthusiasm for guitar, though his passion for music returns as he grows closer to Mafuyu.
 

 A 22-year-old graduate student, and the band's bassist and bandleader. He has a jovial personality and, as the oldest member of the band, often functions as the group's mediator. He has a longstanding crush on Akihiko and eventually begins dating him.
 

 A 20-year-old college music student, and the band's drummer. He is majoring in violin performance, and is skilled in many other instruments. He has had relationships with women and men and is experienced in matters of love and romance, and frequently offers advice to others on these matters. He lives with his ex-boyfriend Ugetsu, with whom he maintains an on and off relationship. Akihiko eventually realizes he has grown to love Haruki and ends things with Ugetsu for good, becoming Haruki's boyfriend and vowing to become a better man for him.

Supporting characters
 

 Mafuyu's childhood friend and boyfriend, who died from suicide prior to the events of the series and appears only through flashbacks. Though Yūki's outgoing and impulsive personality was in stark contrast to Mafuyu's shyness, they bonded over their common background as latchkey kids from single-parent homes, and eventually became lovers. A falling out between the two led Yūki to drink heavily and hang himself. Prior to his death, Yūki played guitar in a band with Hiiragi and Yagi.

 

 A world-renowned violinist, and Akihiko's roommate and ex-boyfriend.

 

 Ritsuka's older sister. She has an unrequited crush on Akihiko but after being rejected develops feelings and a relationship with Koji Yatake. She has interest in art and is good at painting, being part of the art club. She later knows of Ritsuka's and Mafuyu's relationship, along with Akihiko's and Haruki's relationship.

 

 Ritsuka's friend and classmate. A soccer striker who is regarded as a rising athlete in the Kanto region. He has excellent motor skills and is skilled at other ball games, including basketball.

 

 Ritsuka's friend and classmate. Plays center for the school's basketball team.

 

 Mafuyu's former classmate and childhood friend. Formerly played bass in a band with Yuuki and Yagi. He cares deeply for Mafuyu, having been aware of his relationship with Yūki. 

 

 Mafuyu's former classmate and childhood friend. Formerly played drums in a band with Yuuki and Hiiragi.

 

 Haruki's college classmate. A bassist and vocalist, he is also a video editor who helps promote bands. He later dates Yayoi.

 

 A staff member at the music venue where Mafuyu works. Appears only in the anime adaptation.

Media

Manga
Given has been serialized in the bimonthly magazine Chéri+ since April 2013. In Japan, the series has been collected into eight bound volumes published by Shinshokan. An English-language translation is published by Viz Media under their SuBLime imprint, with the first volume released in February 2020. The series will end serialization on March 30, 2023, with an important announcement to follow.

Given is the first multi-volume work produced by manga artist Natsuki Kizu, following her two previous single-volume series Yukimura-sensei to Kei-kun (Yukimura and Kei, 2013) and Links (2014).

Anime
An anime television series adaptation produced by Lerche was announced during a Fuji TV press conference on March 14, 2019. The series aired from July 11 to September 19, 2019 on Noitamina, the network's late-night anime programming block, making Given the first BL series to air on Noitamina. The series is syndicated by Crunchyroll, which simulcast the series worldwide outside of Asia. In Southeast Asia, the series released on WeTV on May 18, 2021.

The series' four original songs — opening theme "Kizuato", closing theme "Marutsuke", and original songs "Session" and "Fuyu no hanashi" ( "A Winter Story") — are composed and performed by Centimillimental, with additional vocals from Mafuyu voice actor Shōgo Yano on "Marutsuke" and "Fuyu no hanashi". The anime features a new voice cast, re-casting the roles from the Crown Works audio drama.

, an original animation DVD (OAD), was released on December 1, 2021, bundled with the manga's seventh volume.

List of episodes
The majority of the episode titles in Given are references to British alternative rock songs, Ritsuka's favorite genre of music; episode nine is titled after the original song performed in the episode.

Media release
Aniplex released Given across four volumes, in DVD and Blu-ray media formats.

Film

A film sequel to the Given anime series was announced on September 19, 2019. The film is a direct continuation of the anime series and adapts the second arc of the manga, which focuses on the relationship between Haruki and Akihiko. Development of the film was transferred from Noitamina to Blue Lynx, Fuji TV's  anime label launched in 2019. The production staff and voice cast of the anime adaptation returned for the film, including Hikaru Yamaguchi as director and Yuniko Ayana as screenwriter. The film was originally scheduled for release on May 16, 2020, but was delayed to August 22, 2020 due to the COVID-19 pandemic. Select screenings of the film from August 22 to 28 included an interview with the film's main cast, and footage of Mafuyu voice actor Shōgo Yano performing "Marutsuke". Streaming service Crunchyroll announced in October 2020 that it had acquired international distribution rights outside of Asia to the film, which it released on February 2, 2021. In Southeast Asia, WeTV released the film on May 25, 2021.

Stage play
A stage play adaptation of Given was announced on April 3, 2020, with Fumiya Matsuzaki as director and Given anime screenplay writer Yuniko Ayana returning as scriptwriter. Originally slated to be staged at theaters in Tokyo, Kyoto, and Osaka from August 15 to September 6, 2020, it was initially cancelled as a result of the COVID-19 pandemic before being rescheduled to November 2021.

Live-action drama
A six-episode live-action drama adaptation of Given was announced on May 26, 2021, and was released on Fuji TV's FOD streaming service on July 17, 2021. Crunchyroll licensed the series for distribution in English in non-Asian regions.

Discography

Audio drama albums
An audio drama CD adapting scenes from the first volume of Given was included with the February 2016 issue of Chéri+. That same month, Crown Works began to release a series of audiobook drama CDs that adapt each volume of the manga.

Extended plays
An eight-track extended play titled Gift (stylized in all lowercase) was released by Sony Music Japan on August 26, 2020. The album, credited to "Given" and marketed as an album by the band, collects the original songs from the television anime series and film. The album's cover artwork features an original illustration by Natsuki Kizu.

Singles

Reception

Manga
The second volume of Given reached #39 on Oricon, selling 17,484 copies in its second week for a total of 30,308 copies as of February 2016. The third volume reached #37 on Oricon, and sold 24,345 copies in its first week. The series ranked #7 in the boys' love category on the digital book service BookLive! in the first half of 2019.

Anime
The anime adaptation of Given was positively received by critics. In a review of episodes one and two for Anime News Network, Steve Jones called the series "one of the season's most emotionally resonant offerings," praising its soundtrack and Yamaguchi's direction. The series' writing, which Jones noted was "undercooked, but not egregiously so" in his initial review, was noted by Jones as improving in subsequent episodes. Specific praise was given to the relationship between Mafuyu and Ritsuka, with Jones calling it "one of the most compelling anime romances of the year."

In a review for Crunchyroll, Adam Wescott called Given "the best show you aren't watching right now," giving specific praise to its sound and lighting design.

Film
In its opening weekend, the film adaptation of Given ranked first in Kogyotsushinsha's tracking of mini-theater ticket sales, and remained in first for five consecutive weeks. In the overall box office, the film ranked 9th in its opening weekend despite opening in only 30 theaters – roughly one-tenth the number of theaters of its closest competitors. By September 14, 2020, the film had sold 100,000 tickets.

Notes

References

External links
  
  
 
 

2013 manga
2019 anime television series debuts
2010s LGBT literature
2010s LGBT-related drama television series
Anime series based on manga
Crunchyroll anime
Drama anime and manga
Japanese LGBT-related animated television series
Japanese boys' love television series
Japanese radio dramas
Lerche (studio)
Music in anime and manga
Noitamina
Romance anime and manga
Shinshokan manga
SuBLime manga
Yaoi anime and manga